Antoninów may refer to the following places:
Antoninów, Opoczno County in Łódź Voivodeship (central Poland)
Antoninów, Rawa County in Łódź Voivodeship (central Poland)
Antoninów, Gostynin County in Masovian Voivodeship (east-central Poland)
Antoninów, Piaseczno County in Masovian Voivodeship (east-central Poland)
Antoninów, Płock County in Masovian Voivodeship (east-central Poland)